Thomas Evenson (9 January 1910 – 28 November 1997) was an English long-distance runner who competed for Great Britain at the 1932 and 1936 Summer Olympics.

In 1932 he won the silver medal in the 3000 metre steeplechase event. Four years later he was eliminated in the first round of the 3000 metre steeplechase competition. At the 1930 Empire Games he won the bronze medal in the 6 miles contest and finished fifth in the 3 miles event. In 1934 he won the silver medal in the 2-mile steeplechase.

Evenson competed at the International Cross Country Championships in 1930–1936 and won seven gold medals: two individual and five with English teams.

References

1910 births
1997 deaths
Sportspeople from Manchester
English male long-distance runners
British male steeplechase runners
English male steeplechase runners
Olympic athletes of Great Britain
Olympic silver medallists for Great Britain
Athletes (track and field) at the 1932 Summer Olympics
Athletes (track and field) at the 1936 Summer Olympics
English Olympic medallists
International Cross Country Championships winners
Commonwealth Games silver medallists for England
Commonwealth Games bronze medallists for England
Commonwealth Games medallists in athletics
Athletes (track and field) at the 1930 British Empire Games
Athletes (track and field) at the 1934 British Empire Games
Medalists at the 1932 Summer Olympics
Olympic silver medalists in athletics (track and field)
Medallists at the 1930 British Empire Games
Medallists at the 1934 British Empire Games